Škerjanc is a surname. Notable people with the surname include:

 Davor Škerjanc (born 1986), Slovenian football midfielder
 Lucijan Marija Škerjanc (1900–1973), Slovene composer, pedagogue, conductor, musician, and writer
 Zoran Škerjanc (born 1964), retired Croatian football player

Slovene-language surnames

de:Škerjanc